Cylisticus convexus, the curly woodlouse, is a species of woodlouse in the family Cylisticidae. It is found in Europe and Northern Asia (excluding China), North America, and South America.

References

External links

 

Isopoda
Articles created by Qbugbot
Crustaceans described in 1778